LEN European U19 Water Polo Championships is a continental water polo tournament held every two years for the players under the age of 19. It was launched by LEN in 1970 for men and in 1994 for women.

Men's tournament

History

Medal table

Women's tournament

History

Medal table

External links
Sport 123 archives men
Sport 123 archives women

LEN water polo competitions
International water polo competitions
Waterpolo
Under-19 sport
Recurring sporting events established in 1970